Cedar Hill Cemetery, previously known as Forest Lake Cemetery, and also formerly Nonesuch Plantation, is a cemetery located in Suitland, Maryland.

History
Following a series of land purchases starting in 1890, Forest Lake Cemetery was chartered and opened in 1895, but by 1913 few bodies were buried there.

In 1913, after going bankrupt in the wake of a failed 1908 sale to a developer,  of the  Forest Lake Cemetery were sold to form the Cedar Hill Cemetery.

The oldest tombstone reads "Philenia W. Patte, Nov. 19, 1871, 58 years".

From 1936 to 1938, Dionicio Rodriguez, a Mexican builder and artist, built six pieces in concrete at Cedar Hill, most using a faux bois technique to make them resemble wood. He built two footbridges, a bench, a table in a pergola, a hollow "tree trunk", and an Annie Laurie Wishing Chair, also in a pergola.

Notable interments
Walter Esau Beall - Baseball Player
Eugene Black - Congressman
Jonathan Bourne, Jr. - Senator
Fred Lewis Crawford - Congressman
Abe Fortas - Supreme Court Justice (unmarked)
Stephen Warfield Gambrill - Congressman
Walter William Herrell - Baseball Player
Edward Keating - Congressman
George Keefe - Baseball Player
Arch McDonald - Sportscaster
Raymond Moore - Baseball Player
John Frost Nugent - Senator
George Sutherland - Supreme Court Justice
Charles Winfield Waterman- Senator
James Eli Watson - Senator

The cemetery has a mass grave for the victims of the Terra Cotta Railroad wreck.

References

External links
 Find a Grave: famous interments

Cemeteries in Maryland
1913 establishments in Maryland
Prince George's County, Maryland